Afanasovo is a rural locality (a selo) in Korochansky District, Belgorod Oblast, Russia. The population was 506 as of 2010. There are 8 streets.

Geography 
Afanasovo is located 12 km south of Korocha (the district's administrative centre) by road. Ternovoye is the nearest rural locality.

References 

Rural localities in Korochansky District